No tienes derecho a juzgarme (English: You have no right to judge me) is a Mexican telenovela produced by Televisa for Canal de las Estrellas in 1979.

Cast 
Enrique Rocha
Alberto Insua
Mary Montiel
Chela Nájera
José Baviera
Eric del Castillo

References

External links 

Mexican telenovelas
1979 telenovelas
Televisa telenovelas
Spanish-language telenovelas
1979 Mexican television series debuts
1979 Mexican television series endings